The 1st Mechanized Infantry Brigade in Hildesheim was a formation in the  Bundeswehr, which was subordinated to the 1st Armoured Division in Hanover. The Brigade was disbanded on 31 December 2007. During its lifetime the Brigade was stationed between the Lüneburg Heath, Harz Mountains, the Solling hills and the River Weser.

Formation sign 
The formation sign displays the white Sachsenross or Saxon steed on a red background within a yellow and white shield. The steed recalls the Welf dukes and the Kingdom of Hanover. The original Saxon tribal emblem was adopted in 1235 by the Welf dukes, the Dukes of Brunswick and Lüneburg, as an additional coat of arms. Through the amalgamation of part of the Lüneburg-Brunswick region with the Principality, later Kingdom, of Hanover the Saxon steed appeared in 1705 on the escutcheon of the kingdom's coat of arms surrounded by the main yellow and white shield. On the foundation of the state of Lower Saxony in 1952 the Saxon steed on a red field became the coat of arms of the state. The white border of the coat of arms, in embroidery shown as a white cord - represents the usual heraldic custom of the German Army: white borders were always the formation signs of the "first" brigades in a division. The superior division as well as the other two brigades in the division traditionally bore an identical formation sign apart from the white border. On the disbandment of the Brigade the sign continued to be worn by Panzerlehrbrigade 9, which gave up its old sign in 2006. The white border remains.

Composition 2007 
In 2007, just before disbanding the brigade was organised as:

 Headquarters Company Stabskompanie, in Hildesheim
 33rd Tank Battalion
 421st Panzergrenadier Battalion
 10th Armoured Engineer Company
 15th Armoured Artillery Battalion
 803rd Armoured Engineer Battalion
 141st Logistics Battalion

Commanders 
The brigade commanders were (rank on taking over):

External links 
 Website of the Brigade
 Federal archive of the Brigade
 Bundeswehr.de: Panzergrenadierbrigade 1 verabschiedet sich aus Hildesheim.
 Relikte.com: Die 1. Panzerdivision der Bundeswehr
 Website of Hildesheim armour
 Traditionsverband Panzerbataillon 14, Hildesheim
 Website of the former PzArtBtl 15
 Website of Panzerjaegerkompanie 10

Brigades of the Bundeswehr
Infantry brigades of Germany
History of Hildesheim
Military units and formations established in 1958
Military units and formations disestablished in 2007
1958 establishments in Germany